Saint-Pée-sur-Nivelle (literally Saint-Pée on Nivelle) is a village and a commune in the Pyrénées-Atlantiques department in southwestern France. It is part of the traditional Basque province of Labourd.

The village is scattered in several neighbourhoods, with the main nucleus located at a crossroads. As its name in French conveys, the village is located on the river Nivelle.

The village is renowned for the "Herri Urrats" festival in support of the Basque-language schools (ikastolak) held in May on a yearly basis at the Lake of Senpere since the early 1980s. Tens of thousands of people turn out.

Population

See also
Communes of the Pyrénées-Atlantiques department

References

Communes of Pyrénées-Atlantiques
Pyrénées-Atlantiques communes articles needing translation from French Wikipedia